All-source intelligence is a term used to describe intelligence organizations, intelligence analysts, or intelligence products that are based on all available sources of intelligence collection information.

History
The definition of all-source intelligence has changed over time.  The distinction between intelligence that is single source and that which uses multiple sources has become outmoded.  Intelligence analysts that produced intelligence primarily from SIGINT or IMINT, for instance, were considered single-INT producers.  Because of the need to incorporate all-relevant information in reporting, IMINT analysts became GEOINT analysts that include not only IMINT but relevant information from other intelligence sources.  This was especially important in the aftermath of the 9/11 intelligence failures.  In the aftermath of these events, collaborative tools such as A-Space and Intellipedia are used for collaboration amongst all members of the Intelligence Community.

Sources
Sources considered for use in all-source intelligence analysis include the following:
HUMINT
MASINT
SIGINT
IMINT or more broadly Geospatial intelligence
OSINT
TECHINT

Organizations
The following organizational components of the U.S. Intelligence Community employ analysts that produce all-source intelligence:
Central Intelligence Agency Directorate of Analysis
Defense Intelligence Agency Directorate for Analysis
United States Army Intelligence and Security Command's National Ground Intelligence Center
Office of Naval Intelligence's Farragut Technical Analysis Center
U.S. Air Force's National Air and Space Intelligence Center
U.S Marine Corps Intelligence's Marine Corps Intelligence Activity
United States Department of State's Bureau of Intelligence and Research
National Security Agency (select components)
National Geospatial-Intelligence Agency 
Federal Bureau of Investigation's Intelligence Branch
United States Coast Guard's Coast Guard Intelligence
DHS Office of Intelligence and Analysis
United States Department of Treasury's Office of Terrorism and Financial Intelligence
Drug Enforcement Administration's DEA Office of National Security Intelligence
United States Department of Energy's Office of Intelligence and Counterintelligence
Office of the Director of National Intelligence:  National Counterproliferation Center (NCPC), National Counterterrorism Center (NCTC), National Intelligence Council (NIC), Office of the National Counterintelligence Executive (ONCIX)

References

 
 
 

Intelligence analysis